The molecular formula C10H7NO3 (molar mass: 189.168 g/mol) may refer to:

 α-Cyano-4-hydroxycinnamic acid
 Kynurenic acid, a product of the normal metabolism of amino acid L-tryptophan